Satya Sorab Bhabha (born 13 December 1983) is a British-American actor known for his role as Matthew Patel in the 2010 film Scott Pilgrim vs. the World and his recurring role as Shivrang in New Girl.

Life and career
Bhabha was born in London, England. His father, professor Homi K. Bhabha, is an Indian Zoroastrian of Parsi heritage. His mother, lecturer Jacqueline Bhabha (née Strimpel), was born in India, to German Jewish parents, and grew up in Italy. He is a graduate of Yale University, where he acted in and directed student theatre productions, is said to have been a member of Skull and Bones, and was a recipient of the Louis Sudler Prize for Excellence in the Arts.

In 2010, Bhabha appeared in the film version of the graphic novel Scott Pilgrim, entitled Scott Pilgrim vs. the World. Bhabha plays the lead role in the Deepa Mehta film Midnight's Children (2012), based on Salman Rushdie's novel Midnight's Children.

In 2012, Bhabha was cast in the Fox sitcom New Girl. He plays a love interest and fiancé of Hannah Simone's character Cece.

Bhabha has been playing the cello since he was very young and has performed around the world in symphonies, as well as with different chamber ensembles. He has played cello for the band He's My Brother She's My Sister, a Los Angeles-based group. He has been married to his husband since 2016.

Filmography

References

External links

1983 births
21st-century American male actors
American people of German-Jewish descent
American people of Parsi descent
American male film actors
American male actors of Indian descent
Indian people of German-Jewish descent
Living people
American gay actors
Male actors from London
Male actors from Los Angeles
Yale University alumni
British LGBT actors